Arrival is the eleventh studio album by the American rock band Journey, released on April 3, 2001. A version with one substituted song was released in Japan in 2000. The album was the band's first full-length studio album with new lead vocalist Steve Augeri, who replaced popular frontman Steve Perry, and with Deen Castronovo, who replaced Steve Smith as the band's drummer.

"Arrival" exhibits hard rock influences akin to the band's material from the 1970s and 1980s, while also featuring several ballads in the signature style the band achieved with Perry. Frontman Augeri's vocal work also retains a style quite similar to Perry. While relatively successful commercially, reaching the #12 spot on Billboards Top Internet Albums chart, Arrival received mixed critical reviews, with some considering the album formulaic, while praising such elements as Neal Schon's guitar playing.

Album details and reception
The album was released in Japan in late 2000, and it leaked to the internet. Negative response from American fans prompted the band to record two more songs with a harder rock edge, and delay the release of the album in the US until these new tracks could be included. The song "I'm Not That Way" was dropped on US version, and the songs "World Gone Wild" and "Nothin' Comes Close" were added.

"All the Way" spent 13 weeks on the Billboard Adult Contemporary Charts, rising as high as No. 22. The album peaked at No. 56 on Billboards album chart, Arrival was the band's first album to not receive at least a gold certification by the RIAA since 1977's Next. It was also their last studio album under Columbia Records, which had been the band's label since their self-titled 1975 debut.

Track listings
The U.S. and SACD editions do not include "I'm Not That Way" as on the Japanese edition, but instead add "World Gone Wild" and "Nothin' Comes Close". The U.S. CD edition features an edited version of "To Be Alive Again", the full version is only on the Japanese CD

Personnel
Band members
Steve Augeri - lead vocals
Neal Schon - lead guitar, backing vocals
Jonathan Cain - keyboards, rhythm guitar, backing vocals, strings arrangements
Ross Valory - bass, backing vocals
Deen Castronovo - drums, backing vocals

Production
Kevin Shirley - producer, engineer, mixing
Aya Takemura - engineer
George Marino - mastering
John Kalodner - A&R

Charts

References

External links
Heavy Harmonies page

2001 albums
Journey (band) albums
Columbia Records albums
Albums produced by Kevin Shirley